In geometry, a trisectrix is a curve which can be used to trisect an arbitrary angle with ruler and compass and this curve as an additional tool. Such a method falls outside those allowed by compass and straightedge constructions, so they do not contradict the well known theorem which states that an arbitrary angle cannot be trisected with that type of construction. There is a variety of such curves and the methods used to construct an angle trisector differ according to the curve. Examples include:
 Limaçon trisectrix (some sources refer to this curve as simply the trisectrix.)
 Trisectrix of Maclaurin
 Equilateral trefoil (a.k.a. Longchamps' Trisectrix)
 Tschirnhausen cubic (a.k.a. Catalan's trisectrix and L'Hôpital's cubic)
 Durer's folium
 Cubic parabola
 Hyperbola       with eccentricity 2 
 Rose curve specified by a sinusoid with angular frequency of one-third.
 Parabola

A related concept is a sectrix, which is a curve which can be used to divide an arbitrary angle by any integer. Examples include:
 Archimedean Spiral
 Quadratrix of Hippias
 Sectrix of Maclaurin
 Sectrix of Ceva
 Sectrix of Delanges

See also
Doubling the cube
Neusis construction
Quadratrix

References
 Loy, Jim "Trisection of an Angle", Part VI

"Sectrix curve" at Encyclopédie des Formes Mathématiques Remarquables (In French)

Curves